The 2019 NCAA Division II women's basketball tournament involved 64 teams playing in a single-elimination tournament to determine the NCAA Division II women's college basketball national champion. It began on March 15, 2019, and concluded with the championship game on March 29, 2019.

The first three rounds were hosted by top-seeded teams in regional play. The eight regional winners met for the quarterfinal and semifinals, better known as the "Elite Eight" and "Final Four" respectively, and National Championship game at Alumni Hall in Columbus, Ohio. In the title game, Lubbock Christian defeated Southwestern Oklahoma State in double overtime to win their second Division II championship.

Bracket

Atlantic Regional
 Site: Glenville, West Virginia (Glenville State)

* – Denotes overtime period

Central Regional
 Site: Hays, Kansas (Fort Hays State)

East Regional
 Site: Philadelphia, Pennsylvania (USciences)

Midwest Regional
 Site: Springfield, Missouri (Drury)

South Regional
 Site: Lakeland, Florida (Florida Southern)

Southeast Regional
 Site: Anderson, South Carolina (Anderson (SC))

* – Denotes overtime period

South Central Regional
 Site: Grand Junction, Colorado (Colorado Mesa)

* – Denotes overtime period

West Regional
 Site: La Jolla, California (UC San Diego)

Finals
Quarterfinals, semifinals and finals were hosted at Alumni Hall in Columbus, Ohio. Regional winners are reseeded in the quarterfinals.

** – Denotes double-overtime period

See also
 2019 NCAA Division I women's basketball tournament
 2019 NCAA Division III women's basketball tournament
 2019 NAIA Division I women's basketball tournament
 2019 NAIA Division II women's basketball tournament
 2019 NCAA Division II men's basketball tournament

References

NCAA Division II women's basketball tournament
NCAA tournament
NCAA
Sports competitions in Columbus, Ohio
Basketball competitions in Ohio
21st century in Columbus, Ohio